Simhadri Satyanarayana Rao was a politician who held the portfolios of Endowments and Commercial Taxes in the governments of N. T. Rama Rao and N. Chandrababu Naidu.

Political life
He joined the Telugu Desam Party under the leadership of NTR after giving up his 30 years of lucrative law practice. In the 1985 mid-term elections to the Assembly, Satyanarayana Rao trounced Mandali Venkata Krishna Rao, who had a long and unconquered stint as MLA from Avanigadda constituency. He was known for his commitment to the development of temples during his two terms and was referred to as ‘devudi mantri' (minister of gods).

Honours
Lok Satta Party honored Simhadri on 9 December 2007, on World Anti Corruption Day, since he stood against corruption and for clean politics.

Personal life
His son, S Chandrasekhar, is an oncologist in Hyderabad.

Death
Satyanarayana Rao underwent treatment for kidney failure in Nagarjuna Hospital at Kanuru near Vijayawada and died after battling for life for three months. He died on 24 September 2010.

See also
 Avanigadda
 Mandali Venkata Krishna Rao

References

Members of the Andhra Pradesh Legislative Assembly
Telugu Desam Party politicians
People from Krishna district
Deaths from kidney failure
1929 births
2010 deaths
Telugu politicians